The Bangalore Water Supply and Sewerage Board (BWSSB) is the premier governmental agency responsible for sewage disposal and water supply to the Indian city of Bangalore. It was formed in 1964.

Water supply

BWSSB currently supplies approximately 900 million liters (238 million gallons) of water to the city per day, despite a municipal demand of 1.3 billion liters. Water for the city (with a population of 10 million) comes from a number of sources, with 80% of it coming from the Cauvery River. Water is also drawn from the Arkavathy River, but the supply does not meet the demand.

The per capita water supply that BWSSB is able to provide averages 100 to 125 liters per capita per day. However, the actual availability of water to the poor areas of the city is limited by infrastructure, and so for these areas, the per capita supply can be as low as 40 to 45 liters per day. The per capita national standard for a city the size of Bangalore is 150 to 200 liters per day, From the month of March 2012, water supply in Whitefield has been stopped, with even rich neighborhoods left to fend for themselves.

Kaveri River project
Cauvery water was originally drawn from a reservoir near the village of Thorekadanahalli. To meet the increasing demand, the "Cauvery Water Supply Scheme" was undertaken by the BWSSB, with Stages I - III completed. Stage IV is currently being built, with Phase I completed and bringing an additional 270 million liters to the city. Construction of Stage IV: Phase II is expected to bring an additional 510 million liters, and will be completed by 2010.

The energy required to transport the water this distance consumes 75% of the agency's revenues.

Arkavathy River
Up to 20% of the normal water supply for Bangalore comes from the Arkavathy River, from two reservoirs built on the river, the Hesaraghatta (or Hesseraggatta) which was built in 1894 and the Tippagondanahalli Reservoir (or T G Halli), which was built in 1933.

In June 2007, T G Halli, from which BWSSB pumped 35 million liters per day into the western parts of the city, had effectively gone dry due to lack of rainfall over its watershed. BWSSB officials stated that they would address the issue initially by making water available for only one hour a day, and then by diverting water from other parts of the city, as well as bringing water in by truck. The quality of the water in the reservoir has also become compromised by the discharge of effluent into the reservoir.

Rainwater harvesting
To further address water supply issues, BWSSB has studied the rainwater harvesting (RWH) techniques used in Chennai, where such methods have greatly reduced water shortage issues. RWH methods are becoming mandatory in Bangalore. In addition, in April 2007, BWSSB issued a moratorium on new building hookups to the water system. The moratorium was lifted in July, but only on new buildings that have a RWH system installed.

Water rationing
The BWSSB is also considering implementing a mandatory water rationing program in order to evenly distribute what water supplies exist. A small trial rationing program was instituted in March 2007. Electronic water meters would shut off after the allotted amount of water was used, but the program was considered a technical failure, due in part to software issues.

Water table issues
Groundwater extraction has caused the water table to drop variously from 90 to 300 meters (300 to 1000 feet) below ground level (as compared to an average water table depth of about 30 meters (90 feet) two decades ago), according to the Indian Institute of Science.

The situation affecting T G Halli are not isolated. Rapid urbanization in and around Bangalore has destroyed many wetlands areas (of the 51 lakes in the city in 1973, only 17 remain in 2007), which has also contributed to the decrease in the water table.

Sewerage system
Bangalore's original sewerage system was built in 1922, a time when the city was much smaller than it is today; the original system served only the heart of the city. In 1950, with the city greatly expanding, a project was initiated to greatly expand the sewerage system. After the BWSSB was formed in the 1960s, programs were again implemented to expand the system to not sewer areas.

There are three main sewage treatment plants, which are located in the Vrishabavathy, Koramangala-Chellaghatta and Hebbal valleys. Two additional mini-plants have been built near Madiwala and Kempambudi.

See also
Infrastructure in Bangalore
Kaveri River Water Dispute
Sanitary sewer overflow

References

External links
Official agency website
BWSSB info on Bangalore' government web site
Archive of news stories about BWSSB
Images of Bangalore

Government of Bangalore
1964 establishments in Mysore State
State agencies of Karnataka
Water management authorities in India